The Adamu Augie College of Education is a state government higher education institution located in Argungu, Kebbi State, Nigeria. The current acting Provost is Abubakar Abubakar Birnin Kebbi.

History 
The Adamu Augie College of Education was established in 1993.

Courses 
The institution offers the following courses;

 Hausa
 Home Economics
 History
 Arabic
 Mathematics
 English
 Geography

References 

Universities and colleges in Nigeria
1993 establishments in Nigeria